Bob Lance Ewbank (January 26, 1928 – November 7, 2014) was an American and Canadian football player. He signed with the Edmonton Eskimos in 1953, but did not appear in any games during the season. He previously played college football at the University of Oklahoma and lettered in 1948 and 1952. His hometown was Norman, Oklahoma. He died in 2014.

References

1928 births
2014 deaths
American players of Canadian football
Edmonton Elks players
Oklahoma Sooners football players
Sportspeople from Norman, Oklahoma